Sven Martin Skagestad (born 13 January 1995) is a Norwegian athlete specialising in the discus throw. He won the bronze medal at the 2014 World Junior Championships.

His personal best in the event is 65.20	metres set in Wiesbaden in 2016.

International competitions

References

1995 births
Living people
Norwegian male discus throwers
Athletes (track and field) at the 2016 Summer Olympics
Olympic athletes of Norway
Place of birth missing (living people)
World Athletics Championships athletes for Norway